The Gulf of Papagayo (meaning "gulf of the parrot") is a large body of water off Guanacaste province and the northwestern coast of Costa Rica. The Gulf and its coastline are part of a major tourism project by Costa Rica's government. Among the most popular destinations on the Gulf of Papagayo are Ocotal Beach, Playas del Coco, Playa Hermosa, and Playa Panama. The Papagayo peninsula is the most developed area in the gulf region. The gulf waters are home to many wildlife including orcas.

References

Bays of Costa Rica
Gulfs of the Pacific Ocean
Geography of Guanacaste Province